Breynia australasiae is a species of sea urchins of the Family Loveniidae, most commonly referred to as a heart urchin. Their armour is covered with spines. Breynia australasiae was first scientifically described in 1815 by Leach.

See also 

 Breynia desorii
 Breynia elegans
 Breynia neanika

References

Animals described in 1815
Spatangoida